Bert Steines (30 December 1929 – 21 September 1998) was a German hurdler. He competed in the men's 110 metres hurdles at the 1956 Summer Olympics.

References

1929 births
1998 deaths
Athletes (track and field) at the 1956 Summer Olympics
German male hurdlers
Olympic athletes of the United Team of Germany
Place of birth missing